The Georgia Nuclear Aircraft Laboratory, also known as AFP No. 67, for Air Force Plant 67 was a United States Air Force test facility located in the Dawson Forest in Dawsonville, Georgia. It was the site of Lockheed's lab for investigating the feasibility of nuclear aircraft. The site was used for irradiating military equipment, as well as the forest to determine the effect of nuclear war, and its effects on wildlife. The area was closed in 1971 and acquired by the city of Atlanta for a second airport, but its topography was determined to be ill-suited for an airport. Documents explaining what went on at the site remain classified, and the entrance to the underground portion of the facility has been buried. The only objects left above ground were the concrete foundations on which the buildings and reactors were placed.

References
 Dawson Forest City of Atlanta Tract – Then and Now
 Georgia EPD
 When the Cold War Came to Dawsonville
 Dawson Forest - City of Atlanta Tract
 Lockheed Ad

External links
 Historical video footage of Georgia Nuclear Laboratories (AFP No. 67)
 Historical video footage of Georgia Nuclear Laboratories (AFP No. 67) (YouTube) 

Buildings and structures in Dawson County, Georgia
Military installations in Georgia (U.S. state)
Energy infrastructure in Georgia (U.S. state)
Research installations of the United States Air Force
Military installations closed in 1971